Jessie Hazel Arms Botke (May 27, 1883 – October 2, 1971) was an Illinois and California painter noted for her bird images and use of gold leaf highlights.

Biography 

Jessie Arms Botke was born in Chicago, Illinois to William Aldis and Martha (Cornell) Arms, and attended the Chicago Art Institute in 1897-98 and again from 1902 to 1905. She took summer classes from artists John Christen Johansen and Charles Herbert Woodbury and continued working with the renowned Albert Herter, who had the most influence in shaping her approach to composition and color.  Following a short trip to Europe in 1909, she returned to her parents Chicago residence and officially listed her profession as “artist, interior decorating.”  She worked as a muralist in New York City (1911) and in San Francisco (1913-14).

She married Cornelis Botke in April 1915 and gave birth a year later to their only child, William.  She and her husband moved to Carmel-by-the-Sea, California in 1919 and became influential figures in the local art colony. Her husband taught at the Carmel Arts and Crafts Club for the 1921 and 1922 seasons, where she and her husband exhibited their paintings at the Arts and Crafts Hall in Carmel. They moved to Santa Paula, California in 1927.

During her career she was a prolific exhibitor.  She was an exhibitor and secretary of the California Art Club. She ran her family's ranch at Wheeler Canyon in Santa Paula, California, while continuing to paint.

Death
Jessie Arms Botke died on October 2, 1971, in Santa Paula at the age of 88. An outdoor memorial service was scheduled at a courtyard fountain adjacent to Citizen's State Bank in Santa Paula. Works by Botke and her late husband were displayed in the bank after the service.

Exhibitions and awards 
 1917 – Chicago Art Institute, Englewood Woman’s Club Prize
 1918 – Chicago Art Institute, Martin B. Cahn Prize
 1919 – Exhibition of Chicago Artists Annual, Chicago Artists’ Medal
 1920 – Chicago Art Institute, William O. Thompson Prize
 1920-1923 – Annual and Holiday Exhibitions of the Carmel Arts and Crafts Club
 1921 - Milwaukee Art Institute (with Cornelius)
 1921 - Crocker Art Gallery in Sacramento (with Cornelius)
 1922 (January) – Exhibition of California Women Painters, Stanford University Art Gallery
 1922 (April) – Exhibition of Carmel and Monterey Artists, Stanford University Art Gallery
 1922 – Chicago Art Institute Annual
 1925 – National Association of Women Painters & Sculptors in New York, Honorable Mention
 1925-1945 – Grand Central Galleries in New York City
 1926 – Exhibition of Chicago Artists Annual, First Prize ($500.00)
 1926 – Del Monte Art Gallery (Monterey, California)
 1926 – Traveling Exhibition (with Cornelius) of Western and Midwestern Museums
 1926 – Hotel San Carlos Art Gallery (Monterey, California)
 1926-1927 – Carmel Art Gallery
 1927 – Stendahl Galleries of Los Angeles (with Cornelius)
 1933 – National Association of Women Painters & Sculptors in New York, Tucker Prize
 1933 – Statewide Annual of the Santa Cruz Art League
 1935 – First Annual Exhibition of the Academy of Western Painters, unspecified prize

Art 
Inspired by early work as a designer of woven tapestries, Botke's art often featured birds, particularly white peacocks, geese and cockatoos. Later in her career, she moved from oils to watercolors, and also focused on still lives.

Botke exhibited regularly throughout the United States during her lifetime. Her work has also been exhibited posthumously at the Irvine Museum and the Museum of Ventura County.

References 

1883 births
1971 deaths
20th-century American women artists
American Impressionist painters
Painters from California
People from Carmel-by-the-Sea, California
School of the Art Institute of Chicago alumni
Bird artists